The International Science Olympiads are a group of worldwide annual competitions in various areas of the formal sciences, natural sciences, and social sciences. The competitions are designed for the 4-6 best high school students from each participating country selected through internal National Science Olympiads, with the exception of the IOL, which allows two teams per country, the IOI, which allows two teams from the hosting country, and the IJSO, which is designed for junior secondary students. Early editions of the Olympiads were limited to the Eastern Bloc, but later they gradually spread to other countries. The Olympiad has no links to the International Olympic Committee nor the US sponsored Science Olympiad.

Overview 
The Olympiads themselves are separate competitions each with its own organizing body, even though they are loosely grouped together as "ISOs". The aims of each ISO are to promote a career in science; to challenge the brightest students from around the world; and to compare the various teaching systems of each country. Although the competitions are aimed for secondary school pupils, the standards of the exams are extremely high. In fact, in several countries, achieving a high ranking in any ISO guarantees access to a university of choice and a fellowship. Massachusetts Institute of Technology and University of Cambridge, for example, recruits a multitude of ISO medalists to their incoming undergraduate class every year.

International Science Olympiads 
Science Olympiads are international student competitions. There are 13 commonly recognized International Science Olympiads:

See also 
 RoboCup
 Tuymaada
 WorldSkills

References

External links 
 

International Science Olympiad